Eero Kilpeläinen (born May 7, 1985) is a Finnish former professional ice hockey goaltender who last played for KalPa in the Liiga. He was selected by the Dallas Stars in the 5th round (144th overall) of the 2003 NHL Entry Draft.

After playing the 2013–14 season in Switzerland with EV Zug of the National League A, He returned to Finland in signing an optional four-year contract with KalPa on March 27, 2014.

References

External links

1985 births
Living people
Ässät players
Dallas Stars draft picks
Finnish ice hockey goaltenders
Jokerit players
KalPa players
Peterborough Petes (ice hockey) players
EV Zug players
Örebro HK players